Hawkeye Community College is a community college in Waterloo, Iowa. Hawkeye has several outlying centers in Cedar Falls, Independence, Grundy County, Waverly, and Waterloo. The college serves all or parts of Benton, Black Hawk, Bremer, Buchanan, Butler, Chickasaw, Fayette, Floyd, Grundy, and Tama counties in Iowa.

History
The Hawkeye Institute of Technology opened on July 1, 1966, replacing the Waterloo Area Vocational School. In 1992, Hawkeye became "comprehensive," adding courses in the liberal arts and sciences. In July 1993, the college's name changed from Hawkeye Institute of Technology to Hawkeye Community College. The college's president is Dr.Todd Holcomb.

Accreditation
Hawkeye Community College is accredited by The Higher Learning Commission and the Iowa Department of Education.

Athletics
Hawkeye launched its RedTails athletics program for the 2015–2016 academic year. That team name refers to the red-tailed hawk and connects to both the "Hawkeye State" nickname and Waterloo's place as the seat of Black Hawk County. The name of HCC's hawk mascot, "Rusty," refers to the rusty red color of the red-tail's feathers.

Transportation
Hawkeye Community College students may ride public transportation provided by the Metropolitan Transit Authority of Black Hawk County for $0.75 a ride with a student ID.

References

External links
Official website

Community colleges in Iowa
Buildings and structures in Waterloo, Iowa
Educational institutions established in 1966
Education in Black Hawk County, Iowa
1966 establishments in Iowa